Yeonnam-dong is a dong, neighbourhood of the Mapo-gu district in Seoul, South Korea. The neighbourhood that was once simply a home to locals, has now emerged into a trendy location for many aspiring artists and designers. As more unique shops and cafes began to fill the streets and alleyways, the area gradually became a very popular area for young university students and tourists. The most popular attraction in Yeonnam-dong is Gyeongui Line Forest Park where the Gyeongui Line train formerly ran before it was moved underground.

See also 
Administrative divisions of South Korea

References

External links
 Mapo-gu official website in English
 Map of Mapo-gu at the Mapo-gu official website
 Map of Mapo-gu at the Mapo-gu official website
 Yeonnam-dong resident office website

Neighbourhoods of Mapo District